Amana may refer to:

Places
 Amaná, a village in La Rioja Province, Argentina
 Amana River, in northeastern Venezuela
 Amanã River, in northwestern Brazil
 Mount Amana, mountain described in the Bible, or an adjacent river
 Amana Colonies, seven villages in Iowa County, Iowa, US
 Amana (CDP), Iowa
 East Amana, Iowa
 High Amana, Iowa
 Middle Amana, Iowa
 South Amana, Iowa
 West Amana, Iowa
 Homestead, Iowa
 Amaná National Forest, in Pará, Brazil
 Amanã Sustainable Development Reserve, a protected area in the Amazon region of Brazil

Organizations
 Amana Alliance, a political coalition in Benin
 Amana Bank (Sri Lanka), a commercial bank in Sri Lanka
 Amana Bank (Tanzania), a commercial bank in Tanzania
 Amana Academy, a charter school in Roswell, Georgia
 Amana Corporation, an American brand of household appliances
 Amana (organization), the Israeli settlement movement
 Amana Mutual Funds Trust, an American financial company
 Amana Contracting and Steel Buildings, a UAE construction company
 Amanat Baghdad, an Iraqi football club, also known as Al-Amana

Other uses
 Amana, the airliner involved in the 1950 Australian National Airways Douglas DC-4 crash in Western Australia
 Amana (plant), a genus of tulip like flowers
 Amana (moth)
 Amana German, a German dialect
 Amana Cup, a defunct association football competition in Yemen
 Amana Church Society, a 19th Century religious movement in America
 The slogan of the Nigerien political party, Union for Democracy and Social Progress

People with the name Amana
 Amana Melome, German musician
 Edet Amana (born 1938), Nigerian engineer
 Yolande Amana Guigolo (born 1997), Cameroonian volleyball player